Bergen Crest Mausoleum is a mausoleum in Hudson County, New Jersey.

Location

Located at 4001 Kennedy Boulevard, the Bergen Crest Mausoleum is in town of North Bergen, New Jersey and is adjacent to the Garden State Crematory. Along the boulevard is the Grove Church Cemetery and Flower Hill Cemetery, as well as Schuetzen Park.

History
On March 27, 1917, plans were approved for the construction of a community mausoleum in North Bergen,
Under the New York & New Jersey Mausoleum Association, the two-story granite and reinforced concrete building was estimated costing $150,000 and was designed by the architect Charles Fall, of the Hoboken Land and Improvement Company. The mausoleum takes its name from its position on Bergen Hill at the edge of the Hudson Palisades where they begin their descent to the west, overlooking Weehawken Cemetery and Palisades Cemetery.

Reported in the American Mercury journal and in The New York Times, on July 3, 1929 a crowd estimated to be between 10,000 and 12,000 people traveling from over northern New Jersey and New York had gathered around the mausoleum in awe at the "faintly shadowed likeness of the head of Christ which was discovered on the whitish gray stone front of the building". Policemen were dispatched to keep the crowd in order and off of the lawn as they looked on curiously. Some considered it to be a miracle, while others viewed it simply as weather markings.

See also
 Hudson County Cemeteries

References

Sources

External links 
 

North Bergen, New Jersey
Cemeteries in Hudson County, New Jersey
Buildings and structures in Hudson County, New Jersey
1917 establishments in New Jersey